Murtaza Hussain (born December 20, 1974 in Punjab) is a Pakistani first-class cricketer. A right-arm offbreak bowler, Hussain has taken over 500 wickets in a career which began in 1990/91. His career best innings figures are 9 for 54. He played for Surrey in 2007 and 2008 and has also played for Pakistan A.
Hussain plays club cricket for Mildenhall Cricket Club in the East Anglian Premier Cricket League.

External links
 

1974 births
Living people
Bahawalpur cricketers
Pakistani cricketers
Khan Research Laboratories cricketers
Pakistan Automobiles Corporation cricketers
United Bank Limited cricketers
Pakistan National Shipping Corporation cricketers
Surrey cricketers
Pakistan Customs cricketers
Islamabad cricketers
Cricketers from Bahawalpur
Punjabi people